Andriy Anatolyiyovych Donets (born 3 January 1981) is a Ukrainian amateur and former professional footballer who currently plays for the Ukrainian amateur club Zbruch-Ahrobiznes Pidvolochysk and works as vice-president of the Ukrainian First League club Ahrobiznes Volochysk.

Playing career
Donets moved to Chornomorets from Tavriya Simferopol in June 2011. To Tavriya, in turn, he moved from FC Zakarpattia Uzhhorod in the summer of 2008.

External links 
 
 
 

1981 births
Living people
People from Volochysk
Ukrainian footballers
Association football midfielders
Ukrainian expatriate footballers
Expatriate footballers in Romania
Ukrainian expatriate sportspeople in Romania
FC Karpaty Lviv players
FC Karpaty-2 Lviv players
FC Karpaty-3 Lviv players
FC Volyn Lutsk players
FC UTA Arad players
SC Tavriya Simferopol players
FC Hoverla Uzhhorod players
FC Chornomorets Odesa players
FC Bukovyna Chernivtsi players
FC Nyva Ternopil players
FC Epitsentr Dunaivtsi players
FC Ahrobiznes Volochysk players
Ukrainian Premier League players
Ukrainian First League players
Ukrainian Second League players
Ukrainian Amateur Football Championship players
Ukrainian football managers
FC Ahrobiznes Volochysk managers
Ukrainian First League managers
Ukrainian Second League managers
Sportspeople from Khmelnytskyi Oblast